The Granites  may refer to.

The Granites, a former name for  Yundamindera, Western Australia
The Granites Airport, an airport in Australia
The Granites gold mine, a mine in Australia
The Granites, (Humboldt County), a mountain range in Nevada

See also
Granite (disambiguation)